Six ships of the Royal Navy have been named HMS Redwing, after the redwing. Another was renamed before being launched, and another was cancelled.

 HMS Redwing was to have been an 18-gun sloop. She was ordered in 1829 and cancelled in 1832.
  was a wooden paddle packet, originally the GPO's Richmond. She was transferred to the Navy in 1837 and sold in 1849.
  was a composite screw gunboat built as HMS Espion but renamed in 1879 and launched in 1880. She was sold in 1905.
  was a tender, previously the War Department's Sir Charles Pasley. She was transferred to the Navy in 1905 and was sold in 1931.
She was renamed HMS Medora in 1915, and finally  in 1916, and launched that year.
  was a tender launched in 1933, sold in 1957 and broken up in 1965.

Royal Navy ship names